U.S. Route 67 (US 67) is a U.S. highway running from Presidio, Texas northeast to Sabula, Iowa. In the U.S. state of Arkansas, the route runs  from the Texas border in Texarkana northeast to the Missouri border near Corning. The route passes through several cities and towns, including Hope, Benton, Little Rock, Jacksonville, Cabot, Beebe, Walnut Ridge, and Pocahontas.

Route description

US 67 enters Arkansas from Texas in Texarkana, concurrent with US 82, along the one-way 7th Street; the other half of the one-way couplet, Dr. Martin Luther King Jr. Boulevard, carries traffic toward Texarkana, Texas. Upon crossing State Line Avenue, the two routes share a brief concurrency with US 71 before that route turns to the south along Hickory Street. Past this intersection, the one-way couplet merges onto 9th Street. Shortly thereafter, US 67 separates from US 82 and travels to the northeast along Broad Street, crossing Interstate 49 and passing Texarkana Regional Airport.

US 67 then runs parallel to Interstate 30, passing through cities such as Hope, Prescott, Arkadelphia, and Malvern. Near Benton, US 67 merges with I-30. The two routes run concurrently to Little Rock, where the freeway also picks up US 65 and US 167.

In Beebe, the two routes begin a concurrency with U.S. 64. The three routes part ways in Bald Knob, with US 67 continuing as a freeway to the northeast. Just north of US 412 in Walnut Ridge, the freeway ends at a large, partially-complete interchange, and US 67 becomes a five-lane undivided highway north to Pocahontas. From Pocahontas, the road turns northeasterly and then easterly as a two-lane highway concurrent with US 62. In Corning, US 62 continues to the east while US 67 turns northward again before crossing the Missouri state line.

History

The southwest-northeast bisector of Arkansas has always been an integral motor route. Prior to designation as US 67, the route was known as the Southwest Trail, an old military road around 1803. The Southwest Trail connected St. Louis, Missouri with Texas by steamboat in Fulton, Arkansas. The main railroad was built along the Southwest Trail, which developed many towns along the route. President Andrew Jackson appropriated money for the route in 1831, and designated it as a National Road. Although the route shifted slightly, it always has followed the natural break between the Ozark Mountains and the Ouachita Mountains and the Mississippi Alluvial Plain.

Money for road maintenance was raised individually by county in the early 20th century, which hindered development of the route. In the 1920s, federal money became available, and the route was designated U.S. Route 67. The routing followed the Lakes to Gulf Highway and the Bankhead Highway. Federal designation brought paving to the route, which grew the small towns along the route.

In early 2009, the Arkansas legislature passed a bill naming the portion of US-67 from the Missouri state line to Jackson County "Rock n' Roll U.S. 67" as a tribute to the route that many musicians of the 1950s and 1960s took as they traveled. Governor Mike Beebe stated that he had hopes that the naming would bring tourism to northeast Arkansas. Portions of the route, and also Arkansas Highway 7 between Hope and Hot Springs frequently used by Bill Clinton is designated The Highway of Hope by Arkansas Code § 27-67-220.

National Register of Historic Places
Several portions of the original late 1920s alignment of US 67 have survived, some of which are listed on the National Register of Historic Places. Near the village of Village Creek Relief it briefly turns west, crossing Village Creek, and then rejoining the railroad tracks near the town of Relief.

Mandeville
Listed on the NRHP as Old US 67, Mandeville, a historic roadway section of US 67 is preserved in Miller County, Arkansas. The southern portion of this road is called Mandeville Road, and is designated Arkansas Highway 296. It is eventually redesignated Miller County Road 138, and is an unnamed side road of the current alignment of U.S. Route 67 (US 67) in its northernmost stretch. Built in 1929 out of concrete, it is the longest stretch of original pavement on the Old US 67 alignment in Miller County.

The roadway was listed on the National Register of Historic Places in 2004.

Future
Arkansas is upgrading US 67 to Interstate standards from Little Rock to the Missouri state line, and the corridor is slated to become an extension of Interstate 57. The freeway currently runs from Little Rock to Walnut Ridge, but it is unknown when and where the freeway north of there to the state line will be constructed.

Major intersections

See also
 
 
 Special routes of U.S. Route 67
 National Register of Historic Places listings in Clay County, Arkansas
 National Register of Historic Places listings in Lawrence County, Arkansas
 National Register of Historic Places listings in Randolph County, Arkansas

References

 Arkansas
67
Interstate 57
Transportation in Clark County, Arkansas
Transportation in Clay County, Arkansas
Transportation in Craighead County, Arkansas
Transportation in Hempstead County, Arkansas
Transportation in Hot Spring County, Arkansas
Transportation in Jackson County, Arkansas
Transportation in Lawrence County, Arkansas
Transportation in Lonoke County, Arkansas
Transportation in Miller County, Arkansas
Transportation in Nevada County, Arkansas
Transportation in Pulaski County, Arkansas
Transportation in Randolph County, Arkansas
Transportation in Saline County, Arkansas
Transportation in White County, Arkansas
Roads on the National Register of Historic Places in Arkansas
National Register of Historic Places in Randolph County, Arkansas
National Register of Historic Places in Lawrence County, Arkansas
National Register of Historic Places in Clay County, Arkansas
National Register of Historic Places in Miller County, Arkansas